Laphria flava, the bumblebee robberfly, yellow robberfly or yellow assassin fly, is a fly of the Asilidae family.

Features 
The size of the yellow predators is variable, reaching a body length of 12 to 25 millimeters and are strongly built. They have dense hairs, which are coloured yellow and black making it resemble a bumblebee. The anterior part of the chest is covered with short, yellow hair; the posterior part of the chest has a dense, long hairs of the same colour, which are directed backwards. The back and legs are also hairy.

Literature 
 Heiko Bellmann: Insekten. 2nd edition, Steinbachs Naturführer, Eugen Ulmer Verlag, 2010, S. 145, 
 Heiko Bellmann: Der neue Kosmos Insektenführer. Franckh-Kosmos, Stuttgart 2009, S. 228,

External links 
 Gelbe Mordfliege Steckbrief bei Insektenbox.de

Brachyceran flies of Europe
flava
Insects described in 1761
Taxa named by Carl Linnaeus